Below is a list of stations broadcasting FM radio broadcasting channels in Vietnam, including channels that are currently broadcasting, have been broadcast and channels in FM frequency old, including radio channels of Voice of Vietnam, local stations and radio stations of communes and districts of provinces/cities, and divided by regions in Vietnam.

Northwest

Northeast

Red River Delta

North Central

South Central

Highlands Central

Southeast

Southwest

Basic Radio
Grassroots radio, also known as "ward speaker, wireless radio broadcasting", is the radio channel at the commune, ward, and village level, run by the people  of the wards, commune in charge, the transmitting station is located at the People's Committee of the ward/commune with a broadcasting power lower than 100W, broadcasting on the frequency channel band FM below 87.5 Mhz. With these channels, only a few devices FM can receive and listen to frequencies below 87.5, most of which are loudspeakers of commune, [...] Ward. (Except for some communes/wards with radio frequency higher than 87.5 Mhz)

See also
Voice of Vietnam
VOH

References

Vietnam